Arcadia Township may refer to:

Arcadia Township, Carroll County, Iowa
Arcadia Township, Kalamazoo County, Michigan, now Kalamazoo Township
Arcadia Township, Lapeer County, Michigan 
Arcadia Township, Manistee County, Michigan
Arcadia Township, Iron County, Missouri
Arcadia Township, Valley County, Nebraska
Arcadia Township, Davidson County, North Carolina, in Davidson County, North Carolina

Township name disambiguation pages